Louisa was launched in France in 1794, probably under another name. She was taken in prize and between 1798 and 1804 she made five complete voyages as a slave ship in the triangular trade in enslaved people. Her fourth voyage gave rise to an influential, and exaggerated, estimate of the profitability of trading in enslaved people. She was lost in 1804 on the coast of Africa on her sixth voyage.

Career
Louisa first appeared in Lloyd's Register (LR), in 1798.

1st enslaving voyage (1798–1799): Captain William Brown acquired a letter of marque on 3 March 1798. He sailed from Liverpool on 10 April. He acquired captives at Malembo and arrived at Kingston on 13 December with 455. Louisa sailed from Kingston on 12 February 1799 and arrived back at Liverpool on 12 April. She had left Liverpool with 57 crew members and had suffered 10 crew deaths on her voyage.

2nd enslaving voyage (1799–1800): Captain Brown sailed from Liverpool on 17 July 1799. He acquired captives at Bonny and arrived at Kingston on 26 February 1800 with 453 captives. Louisa sailed from Kingston on 27 May and arrived back at Liverpool on 15 July. She had left with 47 crew members and had suffered 11 crew deaths on her voyage.

3rd enslaving voyage (1800–1801): Captain George Bernard acquired a letter of marque on 1 May 1801. He sailed from Liverpool on 21 May. Bernard acquired captives at Bonny and arrived at Jamaica on 5 November 1801. Louisa sailed from Jamaica on 15 December and arrived back at Liverpool on 6 February 1802. She had left Liverpool with 50 crew members and she had suffered four crew deaths on her voyage.

4th enslaving voyage (1802–1803): Captain Caesar Lawson sailed from Liverpool on 21 May 1802. He sailed during the Peace of Amiens and so did not acquire a letter of marque. He acquired captives at Bonny and arrived at Montego Bay on 17 November with 326 captives who he landed there. Louisa sailed from Jamaica on 25 December and arrived back at Liverpool on 12 February 1803. She had left Liverpool with 34 crew members and had suffered one crew death on her voyage.

Thomas Leyland & Co., the owners, made a net profit of £19,133 10s 5d on the voyage. The profit per captive averaged £58 13s 10d. This result was highly satisfactory to the owners, if not to the captives.

5th enslaving voyage (1803–1804): War with France had resumed by the time Louisa sailed on her next enslaving voyage. Captain Thomas Harney acquired a letter of marque on 23 May 1803, and sailed on 9 June. He acquired captives at Angola and arrived at Kingston on 21 January 1804 with 308. She sailed from Kingston on 10 April and arrived back at Liverpool on 20 May. She had left Liverpool with 54 crew members and had suffered nine crew deaths on her voyage.

6th enslaving voyage (1804–loss): Captain Harney sailed from Liverpool on 27 July 1804.

Loss
Lloyd's List reported in January 1805 that Louisa, of Liverpool, master, had been lost on the coast of Africa. Her crew were saved. Louisa, Harney, master, had been on her way to Angola when she was totally lost after she struck a hidden rock at "Cove Lopez".

In 1805, 30 British enslaving vessels were lost; 13 were lost on the coast of Africa. During the period 1793 to 1807, war, rather than maritime hazards or resistance by the captives, was the greatest cause of vessel losses among British slave vessels.

Captain Harney sailed Lottery on her eighth enslaving voyage, leaving Liverpool on 26 September 1806. He died on 6 February 1807 during the voyage.

Notes

Citations

References
 
 
 
 

1794 ships
Ships built in France
Captured ships
Age of Sail merchant ships of England
Liverpool slave ships
Maritime incidents in 1804